Sarah E. Gibson is an American solar physicist.  She is a Senior Scientist and past Director of the High Altitude Observatory in Boulder, Colorado.  She is noted for extensive work developing the theory of coronal mass ejections (CMEs) and their precursors, and for organizing scientific collaborations that advance global understanding of the Sun and heliosphere.  She is a recipient of the Solar Physics Division's Karen Harvey Prize for early achievement in solar physics, has been a member of the National Academy's Space Studies Board and co-chair of its Committee on Solar and Space Physics, and is Past President of the IAU's Division E (Sun and Heliosphere).  As of 2019, Dr. Gibson is the Project Scientist for the PUNCH Small Explorer mission being built for NASA.

Education 
Gibson received her Bachelor of Science degree in Physics from the University of Stanford in 1989, then a Master of Science degree in Astrophysics from the University of Colorado in 1993. Shortly after, she completed her PhD, also at the University of Colorado.

Research and career 
Gibson's research interests include solar physics and space weather phenomena.

References

American women physicists
Living people
Year of birth missing (living people)
Stanford University alumni
University of Colorado Boulder alumni
21st-century American women